The 1966 Rothman's 12-Hour was an international sports car race held at the Surfers Paradise International Motor Circuit in Queensland, Australia on 21 August 1966. It was the first of four annual sports car endurance races held at the Queensland circuit between 1966 and 1969.

The race was won by Jackie Stewart and Andrew Buchanan driving a Ferrari 250LM.

Classes
Cars competed in three classes:
 Class A – For Group 7 Two-Seater Racing Cars and Group A Sports Racing cars, divided into two sections, Under 2000cc and Over 2000cc
 Class B – For Group B Improved Production cars divided into two sections, Under 2000cc and Over 2000cc
 Class C – For Group D Series Production cars divided into two sections, Under 2000cc and Over 2000cc

Results

References

Further reading
 2 drive 976m. In big race, The Courier Mail, Monday, 22 August 1966
 Barry Cooke, The longest day, Modern Motor, October 1966, pages 16 to 19
 Scoreboard, Australian Motor Racing Annual, 1967, page 47
 Ford or Ferrari? – 12 hours at Surfers, Australian Motor Manual, November 1966, pages 42 to 45

External links
 Surfers Paradise 12 Hours, www.racingsportscars.com

Motorsport at Surfers Paradise International Raceway
Rothman's 12-Hour